Elections were held in Grey County, Ontario on October 22, 2018 in conjunction with municipal elections across the province.

Grey County Council
The Grey County Council consists of the mayors and deputy mayors of each of the constituent communities.

The Blue Mountains

Chatsworth

Georgian Bluffs

Grey Highlands

Hanover

Meaford

Owen Sound

Southgate

West Grey

References

Grey
Grey County